Harda Assembly constituency is one of the 230 Vidhan Sabha (Legislative Assembly) constituencies of Madhya Pradesh state in central India.

It is part of Harda District.

Member of the Legislative Assembly

Election Results

2013

See also
 Harda

References

Assembly constituencies of Madhya Pradesh